Houston County High School (also referred to as HoCo) is a public high school for grades 9-12 in the city of Warner Robins, Georgia, United States. It was founded in 1991 and is part of the Houston County School System.

The school offers volleyball, cheerleading, football, basketball, soccer, and tennis teams, the Black and Silver Brigade marching band, and an AFJROTC unit: GA-932.

Awards
Houston County High School was honored as a USDOE Blue Ribbon School between 1994 and 1996. The unaffiliated Blue Ribbon Schools of Excellence, Inc. designated Houston County High School as a "Lighthouse School Charter Member" in 2004. In that same year, HCHS was bestowed one of two Intel-Scholastic Schools of Distinction "Best of the Best" awards.

Athletics
As of the 2019–2020 school year the school participates in Region 1 of the 6A Classification of the Georgia High School Association (GHSA).

Baseball
In 2014 and 2016 the Bears won the GHSA 5A State title. In 2021 the Bears beat Lassiter High School for the GHSA 6A State Championship.

Cheerleading
Houston County High School Cheerleading is an athletic program in which the squads compete in state competitions year round. 
In 2012, the varsity team had an undefeated season and went on to become the 2012 5A State Cheerleading Champions.

State Titles
Baseball (3) - 2014(5A), 2016(5A), 2021(6A) 
Cheerleading (1) - 2012(5A), 2022(6A) 
Slow Pitch Softball (1) - 1995(2A)

Other GHSA State Titles
Literary (1) - 1993(2A) 
One Act Play (1) - 2021(6A)

Notable alumni
Jake Fromm, NFL quarterback, Current Free Agent, and star of Netflix series QB1.
D. L. Hall, 21st overall pick in 2017 Major League Baseball draft; selected by the Baltimore Orioles
Brandon King, NFL football player with the Indianapolis Colts
Kyle Moore, football player with the NFL's Tampa Bay Buccaneers and Buffalo Bills, and with the Canadian Football League's Toronto Argonauts
Travis Greene, Billboard and Stellar Award winning gospel artist. 2001 alumni 
Lizz Wright (nee Elizabeth Wright), Jazz and Gospel singer with 7 studio albums

References

External links
Houston County High School

Public high schools in Georgia (U.S. state)
Educational institutions established in 1991
Schools in Houston County, Georgia
Warner Robins, Georgia
1991 establishments in Georgia (U.S. state)